Kushk-e Abul (also Romanized as Kūshk-e Abūl; also known as Kūshk, Qal‘eh-i-Khushk, Qal‘eh Kūshk, Qal‘eh-ye Khoshk, and Qal‘eh-ye Kūshk) is a village in Rak Rural District, in the Central District of Kohgiluyeh County, Kohgiluyeh and Boyer-Ahmad Province, Iran. At the 2006 census, its population was 609, in 134 families.

References 

Populated places in Kohgiluyeh County